Imke Duplitzer (born 28 July 1975 in Karlsruhe) is a German épée fencer. Imke is a four time Olympian (2000, 2004, 2008, and 2012) where she placed 10th, 5th, 5th, and 29th respectively (in the individual competition). She also fenced in three team events at the Olympics, and at the 2004 Summer Olympics she won the silver medal in the team épée competition with Britta Heidemann and Claudia Bokel.
During the 2006 World Fencing Championships she won the bronze medal after beating Romania in the épée team event together with her teammates Claudia Bokel, Britta Heidemann and Marijana Markovic.
She is also a two time European Champion in the individual event (1999 & 2010) as well as being a part of the Gold medal-winning team in 1998.

Duplitzer is openly lesbian.

References

External links
 
 
  (archive)
 
 
 

1975 births
Living people
Fencers at the 2000 Summer Olympics
Fencers at the 2004 Summer Olympics
Fencers at the 2008 Summer Olympics
Fencers at the 2012 Summer Olympics
German female fencers
Lesbian sportswomen
Lesbian military personnel
German LGBT sportspeople
Olympic fencers of Germany
Olympic medalists in fencing
Olympic silver medalists for Germany
Sportspeople from Karlsruhe
Medalists at the 2004 Summer Olympics
LGBT fencers
21st-century German women